"Yakalelo" is a 1998 song recorded by Franco-Algerian world music group Nomads, released as the first single from their only album, Better World (1998). It was a huge hit in Europe in the summer of 1998, like in France, where it reached number two. Additionally, it peaked at number four in Belgium and number nine in the Netherlands. In 1999, it peaked at number 81 in the UK. On the Eurochart Hot 100, the single reached number 12 in August 1998.

Critical reception
Pan-European magazine Music & Media wrote about the song in the review of the group's album Better World, "...Yakalelo, (...) sold over a million units in France alone, thanks to massive promotional support from French TV channel TF1 (the band are signed to its music affiliate). Now, the Nomads' wanderings are taking them to the rest of Europe, via a licensing deal with Sony, with their mixture of Arab-Andalusian music blended with African rhythms and electronic touches, a la Deep Forest. So much for authenticity, but Yakalelo does have all the ingredients to become a pan-European hit..."

Track listing
 12" single, France (1998)
"Yakalelo" (House Remix) – 6:44 
"Yakalelo" (Positive Club Remix) – 5:09
"Yakalelo" (Gipsys' Remix) – 4:06 
"Yakalelo" (Radio Version) – 3:35 
"Yakalelo" (LP Version) – 4:15 

 CD single, Europe (1998)
"Yakalelo" (LP Version) – 4:15 
"Yakalelo" (Grips Tribal Heaven Mix) – 7:29
"Yakalelo" (House Remix) – 6:44 

 CD maxi, France (1998)
"Yakalelo" (House Remix) – 6:44 
"Yakalelo" (Positive Club Remix) – 5:09
"Yakalelo" (Gipsy's Remix) – 4:06 
"Yakalelo" (Radio Version) – 3:35 
"Yakalelo" (LP Version) – 4:15

Charts

Weekly charts

Year-end charts

References

 

1998 debut singles
1998 songs
Dance-pop songs
Epic Records singles
French songs